The 1993–94 División de Honor de Fútbol Femenino was the 5th season of the Spanish women's football first division. Oroquieta Villaverde won its second title.

This was the first season where three points were given by each win.

Teams and locations

League table

References

1993-94
Spa
1
women